Kei Nishikori was the defending champion, but chose not to participate this year.
Second-seeded Gaël Monfils won the title, defeating Ivo Karlović in the final: 5–7, 7–6(8–6), 6–4.

Seeds
All seeds receive a bye into the second round.

Draw

Finals

Top half

Section 1

Section 2

Bottom half

Section 3

Section 4

Qualifying

Seeds
The top four seeds received a bye into the qualifying competition.

Qualifiers

Qualifying draw

First qualifier

Second qualifier

Third qualifier

Fourth qualifier

Fifth qualifier

Sixth qualifier

References
Main Draw
Qualifying Draw

Citi Open - Men's Singles